Barbara Jane Halliday (born 1949) is the mayor of Hayward, California, elected to the office by a plurality in the June 3, 2014 California primary election. Halliday was a city council member for 10 years prior to her election as mayor. She follows Michael Sweeney, who declined to seek the office in 2014. Halliday has a B.A. in American studies from Mary Washington College, then associated with the University of Virginia. She pursued graduate work in journalism and urban studies at the University of Maryland. She has worked as a writer/editor for the Cecil Whig in Maryland, and for a California insurance company, retiring from that position in 2008 after 29 years. Her term began in July 2014.

In November 2018, Halliday was re-elected to second term as Mayor, defeating Council member and college instructor Mark Salinas. Halliday received 56% of the vote compared with Councilman Mark Salinas, who had 42% of the vote.

This was the second time Halliday and Salinas competed for the Mayor's office. In 2014, Halliday was elected Mayor with 39% of the vote, compared to 32% for Salinas, 22% for Council member Francisco Zermeño and 7% for Rakesh Kumar Christian.

References

External links

Halliday at Smartvoter.org
Mayoral candidates' discussion, 2014, including Halliday, at Youtube

1949 births
Living people
California city council members
Mayors of places in California
University of Virginia alumni
University of Mary Washington alumni
Journalists from Maryland
People from Hayward, California
Women city councillors in California
Journalists from California
21st-century American politicians
21st-century American women politicians
Women mayors of places in California